Mijn nachten met Susan, Olga, Albert, Julie, Piet & Sandra  is a 1975 Dutch erotic thriller film produced by Wim Verstappen, directed by Pim de la Parra and starring Willeke van Ammelrooy.

Cast
 Willeke van Ammelrooy as Susan
 Hans van der Gragt as Anton
 Nelly Frijda as Piet
 Jerry Brouer as American
 Franulka Heyermans as Olga

External links 
 

1975 films
1970s Dutch-language films
1970s erotic thriller films
Films scored by Elisabeth Lutyens
Dutch erotic thriller films